Karl Alwin Gerisch (born 14 March 1857 – 8 August 1922) was a German politician of the Social Democratic Party of Germany. He was joint party chairman from 1890 to 1892 with Paul Singer, and from 1894 to 1898 and again from 1903 to 1906 a member of the Reichstag.

References 

1857 births
1922 deaths
Social Democratic Party of Germany politicians
Members of the Reichstag of the German Empire
19th-century German politicians
20th-century German politicians